Enai Noki Paayum Thota is a 2019 Indian Tamil-language action thriller film written, directed and co-produced by Gautham Vasudev Menon. The film features Dhanush, Megha Akash, Sasikumar and Sunaina.

The film began production in March 2016 and was completed in September 2018. It was released on 29 November 2019 and received mixed reviews from critics and audience.

Plot
Raghu lives with his family in Pollachi, and has an elder brother named Thiru, who left their house after his girlfriend was killed during a biking trip. Raghu is in his final year of college studying Computer Science and Engineering when he meets an actress Lekha, who is forced to act against her will. After a few more encounters, they become friends which eventually blossoms into love. Raghu takes her to his house to introduce Lekha to his parents and they accept her. However, a film director named Kuberan and producer arrives at Raghu's house and takes Lekha away after threatening Raghu's family. Raghu doesn't hear from Lekha again and is heartbroken, thinking that she has dumped him.

Four years later, Raghu receives a call from Lekha, who tells that she is with Thiru, who is in trouble and further asks him to arrive at Mumbai to help him. Raghu arrives at Mumbai, and learns that Thiru is actually an undercover cop, who is on a mission to expose an illegal arms deal, and is now on the run as the cops are after him. Thiru is arrested and taken to the court, where the cops and goons attack him. Thiru and Raghu, who arrives there on the behest of Thiru's senior Arun Bhide, subdues the attackers and Thiru escapes without seeing Raghu. Raghu finds the location where Lekha had asked him to arrive and finds her held at knifepoint. He rescues Lekha by defeating the goons and get into an auto, where Thiru appears and the brothers reconcile. However, the auto is attacked and Thiru is killed in the shootout, leaving Raghu devastated.

Before the auto was attacked, Thiru had given a keychain to Raghu and asked him to keep it safe. Lekha then narrates what happened after Kuberan took her from Raghu's house. Kuberan wanted Lekha to act in more films against her interest and to make her accept, he thrashed his son and wife, where she finally agreed to act out of fear for Raghu and his family. Kuberan takes her to Mumbai where he pimped her to other actors, but she is rescued by Thiru. One day, Thiru asked her to accompany him and visited a gym and a few other places. It was during this time that Lekha had contacted Raghu. Raghu takes Lekha to his college senior Mythili's room, in order to keep her safe.

Kuberan learns about Lekha's location and arrives with DCP Nagaraj to take Lekha away, but Raghu thrashes Kuberan and stabs Nagaraj (who was the person behind Thiru's death), where he escapes again with Mythili and Lekha and tries to clear his brother's name. Raghu visits the gym that Thiru had visited, but finds the locker to be empty. The cops arrive with DCP Suraj, who actually got Thiru embroiled in this problem, and arrest Raghu. In the meantime, Kuberan arrives after finding Lekha's location and takes Lekha and Mythili. Raghu is taken to a room, which is revealed to be Thiru's safe house, where he attacks the cops before being shot by Nagaraj. However, One of the cops shoots Nagaraj and the room is locked.

Having been saved by the keychain, Raghu discovers a table which has a keyhole that matches with the key Thiru had given him (the keychain was actually a key) and finds a hard drive and a laptop, which reveals about the illegal arms dealings done by many influential people, including Kuberan. Raghu calls Kuberan and arranges a meeting to provide the hard disk. The cops arrive as well and Raghu shoots all of them dead. Thiru's name is finally cleared and those involved in the dealings were arrested. Raghu arrives at his sister's wedding with Lekha and Mythili. After secretly performing Thiru's last rites, Raghu tells his parents that Thiru is doing well and that he is a cop. In a voice-over, Raghu narrates that he will hunt down the persons, who are also involved in Thiru's death.

Cast 

 Dhanush as Raghu
 Megha Akash as Lekha
 Sasikumar as Thiru
 Sunaina as Mythili
 Senthil Veerasamy as Kuberan
 Rakendu Mouli as Vasanth, Raghu's best friend
 Vela Ramamoorthy as Santhosh, Raghu's father
 S. Kameshwari as Raghu's mother
 Munna Simon as Anand Bhai (Superstar Anand)
 Sindhuri as Saranya, Raghu's sister
 Sanjana Sarathy as Sanjana, Lekha's friend 
 Vinu Kartikeyan S as Kishore
 Ashwin Kumar as Police Officer
 Arjun Chidambaram as Police Officer
 Ashwin Kumar Lakshmikanthan as Saranya's groom
 AM Venkat as Pandian
 Dadhi Raj as Arun Bhinde
 Vinod as Lala
 Ajith Koshy as Inspector Ajith
 Meena Vemuri as Kuberan's wife
 Rana Daggubati (guest appearance in "Naan Pizhaippeno")

Production

Development 
Gautham Vasudev Menon first discussed the script of Enai Noki Paayum Thota with actor Suriya during mid-2013, but the actor's rejection meant that they instead chose to finalise Dhruva Natchathiram as their next project together. However, soon after the pair had creative differences and their intended collaboration in 2013 was cancelled.

The film was relaunched with Dhanush in the lead role during February 2016, after Gautham and Dhanush had discussed the script following their work on a talk show. Intended to be a quick project, the team expected to finish the shoot within two months starting from March 2016. Jomon T. John was signed as the film's cinematographer, while actress Megha Akash was selected to play the leading female role after Gautham was impressed with her work in the unreleased, Oru Pakka Kathai. The film was announced as a joint production between Gautham Menon and P. Madan of Escape Artists Motion Pictures, while Harris Jayaraj was chosen as the music composer, after A. R. Rahman turned down the offer citing a busy schedule . Harris Jayaraj later opted out, and the team considered Santhosh Narayanan and Yuvan Shankar Raja as his replacement, before opting to keep the identity of the final composer as a secret. For a further role of the antagonist, the makers approached S. J. Surya for the character, but he turned down the opportunity. Gautham also considered playing the role, but opted against doing so owing to his multiple ongoing directorial ventures, and Gautham's associate Senthil Veerasamy was later selected.

Filming 
The film's shoot began at SSN Engineering College in Chennai during mid-March 2016. Dhanush and Megha Akash shot scenes on the first day, and were joined by Rana Daggubati, who would portray a guest role. In April 2016, the team travelled to Turkey to film a song and scenes in regions including Istanbul, Ankara, Izmir and Alanaya. Gautham had initially attempted to simultaneously shoot the film's Turkey schedule alongside his commitments for his other long-delayed venture, Achcham Yenbadhu Madamaiyada (2016), but the lead actor of the other film, Silambarasan, opted not to turn up to the shoot. In October 2016, following a brief production break to allow Dhanush and Gautham to finish other ventures, the team shot an action scene with Stunt Silva in areas across Chennai such as Alwarpet and Thiruvanmiyur. Scenes featuring actress Sunaina and actor Vela Ramamoorthy were also shot in late 2016.

In November 2016, Gautham revealed that 85% of the film's shoot was complete and that only one more schedule in Mumbai remained. He added that five songs were shot as montages, because the team had not yet finalised a music composer. The film's first look posters and teaser were released in the same month, and the team announced a February 2017 release, but the date was not met after the film ran into financial troubles. Gautham also later revealed that he was yet to write a climax to the film and that the film had started shoot without a complete script.

Following a year-long production delay owing to financial problems and Gautham and Dhanush's other commitments, another schedule began in December 2017, with Gautham suggesting it would complete the film. A further final ten day schedule was then shot in Mumbai during July 2018 with extra scenes added to include actor Sasikumar, whose character would play the elder brother of Dhanush's character. Principal photography ended in September.

In regard to the continuous delay of the film, Dhanush stated that he was unaware of the financial reasons behind the delay but that he agreed to film whenever Gautham had requested. The South Indian Film Financiers’ Association (SIFFA) later announced that their members would not finance any of Gautham's films unless Enai Noki Paayum Thota or his other long-delayed venture Dhruva Natchathiram were released. The film was censored without Dhanush dubbing for his character, and even by March 2019, Dhanush's salary had not been settled. The film skipped several more proposed release dates throughout late 2018 and early 2019, before getting for release in early September 2019.

Music 

A. R. Rahman was approached to compose for the film, but he declined citing a busy schedule. Then the music director was kept secret by Gautham himself, simply referring the composer as Mr. X. The first single, Maruvaarthai was released on 10 February 2017 and a second single, Naan Pizhaippeno was released on 25 March 2017. Thamarai is the lyricist for these 2 singles.

After much speculations of who being the music composer of the film, it was revealed that Mr. X is Darbuka Siva through Gautham's Twitter post, marking their first collaboration after previously working with Harris Jayaraj, A. R. Rahman, and Illaiyaraja. The restrung version of Maruvaarthai was released on 17 October and therefore, all the songs of this film are now credited with Darbuka Siva as the music director. In April 2019, the audio rights were transferred from Ondraga to Sony Music.

Release 
Enai Noki Paayum Thota was planned to release in December 2018 but was delayed due to unforeseen circumstances. In November 2018, Lyca Productions bought the film's rights but soon opted out due to some issues. As of May 2019, the film was facing uncertainty over its release due to Menon's financial problems and Arka Media Works' stay on films produced/distributed by S. N.  Rajarajan. However, in August, Menon announced that the film would be released on 6 September 2019. On 5 September, the film's release was further delayed due to lingering financial issues; it was later pushed to 15 November 2019, and then finally to 29 November after Ishari K. Ganesh of Vels Films International bought the film's rights. This Film was sold by Zee Tamil.

Reception

Critical reception 
Enai Noki Paayum Thota received mixed reviews from critics and audience.

Pradeep Kumar of The Hindu wrote "ENPT is no stroke of genius from Gautham Menon. But the way he makes the film punch way above its weight, is a mark of one". India Today gave 2.5 out of 5 stars stating "Director Gautham Menon's Enai Noki Paayum Thota starring Dhanush and Megha Akash has a solid storyline. But the promising action drama is diluted by weak writing. Marks Gautham Menon's big-screen comeback after four years. Backed by brilliant performances, the film is a decent watch minus the crazy coincidences". The News Minute gave 2.5 out of 5 stars stating "Gautham Menon’s film is stylish but has little substance, his thrillers increasingly feel like he’s remaking the same template over and over again". The Times of India gave 2 out of 5 stars stating "Enai Noki Paayum Thota is more or less a reiteration of Gautham Vasudev Menon's previous film, Achcham Yenbadhu Madamaiyada. A competently shot but less than compelling film".

News18 gave 2 out of 5 stars stating "Cinema has long ceased to be fantasy and make-believe. Gautham Vasudev Menon helms this kind of unbelievable existence, his earlier works too have more or less remained in this groove. Dhanush is not a bad actor, and has learnt to be subdued and subtle, not giving himself to histrionics. But his range is something we have never seen". Firstpost gave 2 out of 5 stars stating "Enai Noki Paayum Thota is way off the target and should have been shorter. The Gautham Menon magic is clearly missing". IndiaGlitz gave 3 out of 5 stars stating "Though completely reminiscent of Achcham Yenbathu Madamaiyada, Enai Nokki Paayum Thotta survives and works despite predictability, thanks to Dhanush, the rich technical aspects and few enjoyable GVM brand romance sequences and terrific action episodes". Sify gave 2.5 out of 5 stars stating "Average romantic action thriller".

References

External links 
 

Films directed by Gautham Vasudev Menon
Indian action thriller films
2019 action thriller films